The Ponița is a right tributary of the river Crasna in Romania. It discharges into the Crasna near Horoatu Crasnei.

References

Rivers of Romania
Rivers of Sălaj County